11 bit studios S.A. is a game development company based in Warsaw, Poland. The studio was founded in 2010 by former members of CD Projekt and Metropolis Software. The studio is most known for developing Anomaly: Warzone Earth (2011), This War of Mine (2014), and Frostpunk (2018).

History
The company was officially formed on 11 September 2010, founded by CD Projekt and Metropolis Software developers and staff members. Currently, they employ approximately two hundred people. The company's goal is to create games suitable for both hardcore gamers as well as casual gamers. They are well known for developing Anomaly: Warzone Earth, a real-time strategy reversed tower defense, and This War of Mine, which was often praised by critics for its depiction of civilians in a city under a siege similar to the Siege of Sarajevo.

The studio's most recent release, Frostpunk, sold over 250,000 copies in its first three days. Frostpunk depicts a dystopian/late 19th century England that has been overtaken by the frost, and the player is tasked with managing humanity's last city. In 2020, it was revealed that the company was investing $21 million to fund the development of three projects and four games signed to its publishing labels. One of them, Frostpunk 2, was announced on August 12, 2021.

Games

Developed

Published

References

External links
 

Companies based in Warsaw
Video game companies established in 2010
Polish companies established in 2010
Companies listed on the Warsaw Stock Exchange
Video game companies of Poland
Video game development companies
Video game publishers